Çiçekli (literally "with flowers" or "place with flowers") is a Turkish place name and may refer to:

 Çiçekli, Ceyhan, a village in Ceyhan district of Adana Province, Turkey
 Çiçekli, Gercüş, a village in Gercüş district of Batman Province, Turkey
 Çiçekli, İvrindi, a village
 Çiçekli, İznik
 Çiçekli, Pasinler
 Çiçekli, Sungurlu
 Çiçekli, Tarsus, a village in Tarsus district of Mersin Province, Turkey
 Çiçekli, Yüreğir, a village in Yüreğir district of Adana Province, Turkey

See also
 Çiçeklidağ, Hanak, ("flower mountain"), a village in Hanak district of Ardahan Province, Turkey

Cicekli is also a village near Akincilar- Sivas Turkey